The Peasants and Workers Party of India (PWP) is a Marxist political party in Maharashtra, India. The party was founded on 13.06.1948, having its roots from the pre-Independence period and has around 1,00,000 members. The influence of the party is largely limited to three districts. The party was founded in Maharashtra by Keshavrao Jedhe of Pune, Shankarrao More, Bhausaheb Raut of Mumbai, Nana Patil of Satara, Tulshidas Jadhav of Solapur, Dajiba Desai of Belgaum, Madhavrao Bagal of Kolhapur,  P K Bhapkar and Datta Deshmukh of Ahmednagar, Vithalrao Hande and others.

Member of legislative council of Maharashtra, Mr. Jayant Prabhakar Patil, is general secretary of the party.
The party has 1 MLA and 2 MLCs. The party has a strong hold on Raigad District as well as party has Zilla Parishad members in 6 districts of Maharashtra, namely Raigad, Solapur, Nashik, Nagpur, Nanded and Parabhani.

The student organization of the party is called Purogami Yuvak Sanghatna.

The trade union of the party is called All India Workers Trade Union, All India Insurance Workers Union and its Trade Union Federation is Progressive Workers and Peasants of India.  Comrade Janardan Singh is General Secretary of these trade unions and trade union federation. The party has played a very important role in Samyukta Maharashtra Movement under the leadership of Bhausaheb Raut, Uddhavrao Patil, Dajiba Desai. Most important meetings of this movement and coordination took place at the Mumbai -Koliwadi, Girgaum bungalow of Shri Bhausaheb Raut.

In the 2014 Maharashtra Legislative Assembly election at age 88, Ganpatrao Deshmukh of the party won the Sangole constituency for record 11th time with 94,374 votes, defeating Shahajibapu Patil of Shiv Sena by 25,224 votes, while the NCP did not field a candidate against him.

Prominent leaders
 Narayan Nagu Patil
 Ganpatrao Deshmukh
 Udhavrao Patil
Mohan Patil
Prabhakar Patil
 Dattatray Narayan Patil
 Keshavrao Dhondage
 Annasaheb Gavhane
Meenakshi Patil
 Sheshrao Deshmukh
 Balaram Dattatray Patil
 Vivek Patil
 Shyamsundar Dagdoji Shinde
 Krishnarao Dhulap
 Vikas(Kaka) Shinde
 Dinkar Patil
 Bhausaheb Raut
 B. N. Deshmukh
 Chandrakant deshmukh
 Dr. Aniket Chandrakant Deshmukh
 Babasaheb deshmukh
 Kisan jayram nikam
Dhairyashil Patil
Nilima Patil
Yogiraj Jaybhay Patil
Aswad Patil
Chitra Patil
J M Mhatre
Pritam Mhatre
Subhash Patil (Pandit Shet)
Chitralekha Patil
Valmik kadam

Trade Union Leader

References

Communist parties in India
Political parties established in 1947
Peasants' and Workers' Party of India
Farmers' rights activists
1947 establishments in India